Pasupathy (born 5 September 1967) is an Indian actor. He appeared in critically acclaimed roles in many noted films in Tamil cinema, playing supporting, antagonistic, comedic as well as protagonistic roles.

His performance in E (2006) earned him a Filmfare Award for Best Supporting Actor and a Tamil Nadu State Film Award for Best Supporting Actor. He also won an ITFA Best Supporting Actor Award for his role in Kuselan (2008). He has also appeared in Malayalam, Telugu, and Kannada films.

Early life
Pasupathy Masilamani was born in 1967 at Vannandurai, a northern neighbourhood Chennai, India. In 1984, he joined the Chennai-based theatre group "Koothu-P-Pattarai" where he was there till 1997. He studied and grew up there till he started to act in films. He became friends with actor Nassar who was in the film institute and later joined the Koothu-P-Pattarai.

Career
When he was working in Marudhanayagam, Nassar asked him whether he was interested in films. Pasupathy was then introduced to Kamal Haasan and he was given the villain role in Marudhanayagam. Pasupathy stated "That was the first time I was before the camera". Marudhanayagam was shelved and Nasser's Mayan which he was also part of was his first release.

He got his first major recognised role in Virumaandi as Kothaala Thevar. He later began appearing in negative roles in a number of films such as Dhool, Sullan, Madhurey and Thirupaachi. He later branched out into comedy with Mumbai Xpress and Majaa. His first lead role was in the National Film Award winning film Veyyil. He further played lead roles in Raman Thediya Seethai, in which he appeared as a blind radio jockey, and Kuselan in which he was seen as a village barber. In Aravaan, a period-based action drama, he played Kombhoodhi, the warrior head of a village in the 18th century, for which he had trained at the gym for six months.

His role as Annachi in the 2013 Tamil film Idharkuthane Aasaipattai Balakumara won critical accolades. He acted in an independent English film called The Last Vision, film made by youngsters from Kerala for festivals. Pasupathy's upcoming films include Appavin Meesai, directed by Rohini, where he plays a therukooththu artiste, Mosakutty, where he essays a positive role, Sakunthalaavin Kaadhalan, Yagavarayinum Naa Kaakka, directed by actor Aadhi's brother Sathya Prabhas Pinisetty, Anjala, directed by Thangam Saravanan and Vetrimaran's untitled film with Dhanush and Vijay Milton's untitled film with Vikram. In 2014, Pasupathy played Aditya Karikalan in a theatrical adaptation of Ponniyin Selvan.

Filmography

Films

Theatre

Web series

References

External links 

 

|-
! colspan="3" style="background: #DAA520;" | Filmfare Awards South
|-

|-

1969 births
Living people
Tamil male actors
Filmfare Awards South winners
International Tamil Film Award winners
Male actors from Chennai
Male actors in Tamil cinema
Male actors in Malayalam cinema
Indian male film actors
21st-century Indian male actors
Tamil actors
Male actors in Telugu cinema